The Jenckes House is a historic house at 81 Jenckes Hill Road in Lincoln, Rhode Island.  It is a -story wood-frame structure, five bays wide, with a central chimney.  A 20th-century screened porch extends to the right side of the house, and a modern kitchen ell extends to the rear.  The house is an 18th-century construction by a member of the locally prominent Jenckes family.

The house was listed on the National Register of Historic Places in 1984.

See also
Jenckes House (Old Louisquisset Pike, Lincoln, Rhode Island)
National Register of Historic Places listings in Providence County, Rhode Island

References

Houses on the National Register of Historic Places in Rhode Island
Houses completed in 1760
Houses in Lincoln, Rhode Island
National Register of Historic Places in Providence County, Rhode Island